Joel Matthias Konzen (born November 6, 1950) is an American prelate of the Roman Catholic Church who has been serving as an auxiliary bishop of the Archdiocese of Atlanta since 2018.

Biography

Early life 
Joel Konzen was born November 6, 1950 in Toledo, Ohio, and grew up in Oak Harbor, Ohio. He took his first vows as a Marist in 1975. He took perpetual vows in the Society of Mary, and was ordained a deacon in 1978.

Konzen has a Bachelor of Arts degree in English from St. Meinrad Seminary in St. Meinrad, Indiana, and a Master of Divinity degree from Notre Dame Seminary in New Orleans.  He also holds a Master of Theology degree in systematic theology and a Master of Arts degree in educational administration from the Catholic University of America in Washington, D.C.

Priesthood 
On May 19, 1979, Konzen was ordained to the priesthood for the Society of Mary by Bishop Stanley Ott . 

Konzen took his first position at Marist School in Atlanta in 1980, where he remained for nine years in roles as teacher, admissions director, principal and president. While a graduate student at Catholic University, he served as vicar provincial of the former Washington Province of the Society of Mary. From 1992 to 1997, Konzen was principal and president at St. Michael’s Catholic Academy in Austin, Texas. In 1997, he returned to Washington, D.C., where he was vicar provincial again for two years.

Konzen returned to Marist School in Atlanta in 1999, where he has since served as principal and had recently been named president.  He assisted in the founding of two new Catholic schools in Atlanta: Notre Dame Academy and Cristo Rey Atlanta Jesuit High School.  Konzen currently serves on the boards of Notre Dame Preparatory School and Marist Academy in Pontiac, Michigan; Notre Dame Academy in Duluth. Minnesota; Cristo Rey Atlanta Jesuit High School; and the Georgia Independent School Association. In 2015, he received the Educational Excellence Award of the National Catholic Educational Association (NCEA).

In addition to his time at Marist School in Atlanta, Konzen taught at St. Peter Chanel High School in Bedford, Ohio (1976–1977), served as a deacon at St. Andrew the Apostle Parish in New Orleans (1978–1979) and as a priest at St. Edmond Parish in Lafayette, Louisiana. (1979–1980).  He served as principal/president at St. Michael’s Academy in Austin,Texas, from 1992–1997.

Auxiliary Bishop of Atlanta
Pope Francis appointed Konzen as an auxiliary bishop for the Archdiocese of Atlanta on February 5, 2018. On April 3, 2018, Konzen was consecrated by then Archbishop Wilton Gregory at the Cathedral of Christ the King in Atlanta

On May 24, 2019, after the installation of Gregory as the Archbishop of Washington, the college of consultors elected  Konzen as the administrator of the archdiocese.  Konzen's administrator responsibilities ended on May 6, 2020 with the installation of then Bishop Gregory Hartmayer as the new Archbishop of Atlanta.

Coat of Arms

For  Konzen the shield is silver (white) with a blue pile (an "A" shaped device) upon which is displayed the conjoined "A" and "M," known an "the monogram of Mary," in silver (white) that is the emblem of the Society of Mary. The pile resembles an inlet of water, such as a bay or harbor, and this pile is charged with a gold (yellow) oak leaf to signify Oak Harbor, Ohio, Konzen's home town. Above the pile are an open book (gold [yellow] with red edges) and a red cross o signify that  Konzen has spent most of his life in education, in a Catholic environment, including his last position, before becoming a bishop, as president of the Marist School.

For his episcopal motto, Konzen adopted the Latin phrase "Miserere gaudens," taken from Romans:12. This passage can be paraphrased as "Be merciful, and with a cheerful heart."

See also

 Catholic Church hierarchy
 Catholic Church in the United States
 Historical list of the Catholic bishops of the United States
 List of Catholic bishops of the United States
 Lists of patriarchs, archbishops, and bishops

References

External links

Roman Catholic Archdiocese of Atlanta Official Site

Episcopal succession

 

1950 births
Living people
People from Oak Harbor, Ohio
20th-century Roman Catholic bishops in the United States
People from Toledo, Ohio
Catholics from Ohio
Bishops appointed by Pope Francis